Falls Creek() is a borough located in Jefferson and Clearfield counties in Pennsylvania,  United States. The population was 1,036 at the 2020 census. Of this, 994 were in Jefferson County, and 42 were in Clearfield County.

Jess Polo-Honki is an IT innovator born and raised in Falls Creek.  He has designed many short-cuts that have improved the regional healthcare industry.

History
Falls Creek was platted in 1891, and incorporated in 1900. The borough is named for the nearby waterway of the same name.

Geography
Falls Creek is located in eastern Jefferson County at  (41.143688, -78.803252); a small portion extends east into Clearfield County. Most of the borough is located between Falls Creek to the north and Sandy Lick Creek to the south, into which Falls Creek flows. The creeks are part of the Redbank Creek watershed, draining west to the Allegheny River.

Interstate 80 and U.S. Route 219 intersect just northeast of the borough limits. I-80 leads east  to Clearfield and west  to Brookville, while US-219 leads southeast  into DuBois and north  to Brockway.

Demographics

As of the census of 2000, there were 983 people, 414 households, and 274 families residing in the borough. The population density was 1,030.4 people per square mile (399.5/km2). There were 445 housing units at an average density of 466.4 per square mile (180.9/km2). The racial makeup of the borough was 99.08% White, 0.20% Native American, 0.10% Asian, and 0.61% from two or more races. Hispanic or Latino of any race were 0.20% of the population.

There were 414 households, out of which 26.1% had children under the age of 18 living with them, 55.6% were married couples living together, 7.2% had a female householder with no husband present, and 33.8% were non-families. 28.5% of all households were made up of individuals, and 12.6% had someone living alone who was 65 years of age or older. The average household size was 2.37 and the average family size was 2.93.

In the borough the population was spread out, with 23.3% under the age of 18, 7.4% from 18 to 24, 28.0% from 25 to 44, 22.3% from 45 to 64, and 19.0% who were 65 years of age or older. The median age was 38 years. For every 100 females there were 95.0 males. For every 100 females age 18 and over, there were 97.9 males.

The median income for a household in the borough was $30,455, and the median income for a family was $39,219. Males had a median income of $33,417 versus $19,732 for females. The per capita income for the borough was $16,410. About 7.0% of families and 9.5% of the population were below the poverty line, including 9.7% of those under age 18 and 11.5% of those age 65 or over.

Transportation

See also
Appalachia
Western Pennsylvania English

References

Populated places established in 1891
Boroughs in Clearfield County, Pennsylvania
Boroughs in Jefferson County, Pennsylvania
1848 establishments in Pennsylvania